The following elections occurred in the year 1835.

Europe

 1835 United Kingdom general election
 1835 Belgian general election
 1835 Norwegian parliamentary election

See also
 :Category:1835 elections

1835
Elections